Joonatan Jürgenson (born 24 October 1991 in Tartu) is an Estonian classical pianist from Tõravere. He made his debut at the age of 12 after receiving the 1st prize at the "Young Musician" competition in Tallinn, 2004.

Education 
Joonatan's first contact with the music world was through singing in the kindergarten, as he successfully took part in local singing competitions. He continued to sing through the first years of school in an ensemble led by Kaie Tohver in Nõo Gymnasium. Joonatan started his piano studies at the age of 7 in Nõo Music School with Katrin Mägi. He soon continued his studies in Heino Eller Tartu Music College, where his teacher was the headmaster of the school Kadri Leivategija. In 2016 Joonatan received his master's degree cum laude from the Estonian Academy of Music and Theatre, where he studied with professor Ivari Ilja. In 2014-2015 he completed his studies in London at the Guildhall School of Music and Drama with the professor Ronan O'Hora.

Career 
As a solo pianist and an active chamber musician, Joonatan Jürgenson has successfully taken part in many national and international competitions as well as festivals from an early age. His debut was in 2004, after he received the 1st prize and special prizes for eminent style and Bach's interpretation in an international competition "Young Musician" held in Tallinn, Estonia. The same year he performed at the Opening Concert of the festival "Helimaastikud. Jaapan" ("Soundscapes. Japan") performing Risto Laur's "Tüdruk ja draakon" ("The Girl and the Dragon") at the age of 12 with the Sinfonietta of Heino Eller Music College under the baton of Lilyan Kaiv. In 2010 he was given Ago Russak's scholarship for excellent results as a young music student. He has also collaborated with the Grammy award-winning composer and conductor Eric Whitacre during his author concert in St John's Church in Tallinn in 2013. In San Sebastian International Piano Competition in 2013, he received the 2nd prize and the special prize for the best interpretation of the modern basque composer. In addition to concerts in Estonia, he has also performed in Latvia, Lithuania, Finland, Poland, Italy, Spain, Portugal, UK, USA and Armenia. He has collaborated with many orchestras and conductors such as Estonian Academy of Music and Theater Symphony Orchestra, Heino Eller's Music School Sinfonietta, Pärnu City Orchestra, Terre del Nord Festival Orchestra and the West Islands' Chamber Orchestra with the conductors Paul Mägi, Edoardo Narbona,  and Toomas Vavilov. Terre del Nord Festival in Turin, Italy, featured Joonatan as an opening performer, where he played a solo recital with northern music in programme. He was also invited back for the next edition in 2016, but that time for the final concert, where he played with the Terre del Nord Festival Orchestra music by Lars-Erik Larsson. In addition to solo career he also teaches masterclasses to young Estonian pianists.

Discography 
Félix Ibarrondo's Prélude was released in March 2022 by Joonatan Jürgenson as a single. The release is available digitally.
In October 2021 he released a new album with Estonian chamber music for the saxophone and the piano with the Estonian saxophonist Rene Laur. The album features a commissioned piece by the Estonian-American composer Jonas Feliks Tarm. Additionally there are saxophone and piano sonatas by Estonian composers Eduard Tubin and Hillar Kareva. It premiered on the 22nd of October.In March 2020 Joonatan Jürgenson released a debut solo album. The music on the album is composed by Robert Schumann and Pyotr Tchaikovsky who were both inspired by the Romantic author E.T.A. Hoffmann.

Chamber music 
As well as solo pianist, Joonatan is also an active chamber musician. He is a part of a piano trio Trio Fantastico, which consists of Mari-Liis Urb (violin), Kristian Plink (violoncello) and Joonatan Jürgenson (piano). In the 8th International Music Festival in Gyumri, Armenia, in 2016, the trio won the Grand Prix. The ensemble has also given concerts in Poland Wilanów Palace in 2016, participated in the Le Strade d'Europa Music Festival in Italy in Rome, L'Aquila and Nepi and gave three concerts in the Harmos Festival in Porto, Portugal in 2018.

Also he is collaborating with saxophonist Rene Laur with whom he has performed in many festivals (Eduard Tamme nim. Võru Puhkpillifestival; Mürtsub pill; Festival TubIN) and given out a chamber music album (Pildid lapsepõlvest). In 2015 they received I prize in International Competition of Student and Schoolchildren’s Chamber Ensembles and Accompanists in Klaipeda, Lithuania and the Grand Prix in 2016 edition of festival-competition “Renaissance” in Gyumri, Armenia. In 2022 they performed Eduard Tubin's music in Festival TubIN in Tartu, Estonia.

Unions 
Joonatan Jürgenson is a member of the Association of Estonian Professional Musicians and Estonian Piano Teachers' Union.

Personal 
Joonatan Jürgenson is the son of Estonian politician Kalle Jürgenson and philologist Heli Jürgenson and he has 3 brothers: journalist Kristjan Pruul, football player Markus Jürgenson and biologist Martin Jürgenson.

References

Press 
https://www.ajakirimuusika.ee/single-post/t-ubinasaak-2022 - Muusika, Andre Hinn, 12/2022

https://klassikaraadio.err.ee/1608735841/helikaja-15-oktoobril-festival-tubin-tartus - ERR, Klassikaraadio, Helikaja, Liina Vainumetsa, 10/2022

https://klassikaraadio.err.ee/1608620329/helikaja-plaadinoel-rene-laur-joonatan-jurgenson-pildid-lapsepolvest - ERR, Klassikaraadio, Helikaja, Nele-Eva Steinfeld, 6/2022

https://www.ajakirimuusika.ee/single-post/joonatan-jürgenson-klaver-rene-laur-saksofon-pildid-lapsepõlvest - Muusika, Tiiu Sisask, 12/2021

https://klassikaraadio.err.ee/1608383987/album-pildid-lapsepolvest-rene-laur-joonatan-jurgenson-jj-2021 - ERR, Klassikaraadio, Album, Nele-Eva Steinfeld, 11/2021

https://klassikaraadio.err.ee/1608364335/delta-22-oktoobril-erso-ja-noored-uus-plaat-aeternus-saksofonialbum/1398299 - ERR, Klassikaraadio, Delta, Nele-Eva Steinfeld, 10/2021

https://klassikaraadio.err.ee/1608146059/album-joonatan-jurgenson-schumann-ja-tsaikovski-jj-2020 - ERR, Klassikaraadio, Album, Nele-Eva Steinfeld, 3/2021

https://www.ajakirimuusika.ee/single-post/joonatan-jürgenson-joonatan-jürgenson - Muusika, Jorma Toots, 11/2020

https://www.meiemaa.ee/index.php?content=artiklid&sub=6&artid=75723 - Meie Maa, Anneli Tarkmeel, 4/4/17

https://dea.digar.ee/cgi-bin/dea?a=d&d=noovalla20161001.2.16&e=-------et-25--1--txt-txIN%7ctxTI%7ctxAU%7ctxTA----------- - Nõo Valla Leht, Milvi Pensa, 1/10/16

https://www.ajakirimuusika.ee/single-post/2017/05/02/Maailma-lõpus-on-orkester - Muusika, Anneli Tarkmeel, 2/5/17

https://arhiiv.saartehaal.ee/2017/04/05/kevadkontsert-oli-nime-vaart/ - Saarte Hääl, Erki Aavik, 5/4/17

External links 
 http://interpreet.ee/interpreedid/joonatan-jurgenson/ - Association of Professional Estonian Musicians
 https://www.emic.ee/joonatan-jurgenson - Estonian Music Information Centre

1991 births
People from Tartu
Estonian classical pianists
Estonian Academy of Music and Theatre alumni
Living people
21st-century Estonian musicians
21st-century classical pianists